Barrie Mau (born 2 August 1939) is a former Australian rules footballer who played for the St Kilda Football Club in the Victorian Football League (VFL).

Notes

External links 

Living people
1939 births
Australian rules footballers from Victoria (Australia)
St Kilda Football Club players
Ormond Amateur Football Club players